Agrostis vinealis is a species of grass known by the common names brown bentgrass and brown bent, which can be found from Russia to Mongolia, China, Pakistan, India and Alaska. It was introduced to Greenland and South Georgia and the South Sandwich Islands.

Description

It have solitary spikelets which carry one fertile floret which have a pubescent callus. The glumes are no different in size then the spikelet. They both are lanceolate, membranous, have no lateral veins and have acute apexes. Flowers are membranous too and have two lodicules. The fruits are caryopses with an additional pericarp and linear hilum with farinosed endosperm.

Distribution

References

Further reading

vinealis
Grasses of China
Flora of Scotland
Flora of Iceland
Flora of Heilongjiang
Flora of Jilin
Flora of Liaoning
Flora of the Indian subcontinent
Flora of Mongolia
Flora of Russia
Flora of Alaska
Flora without expected TNC conservation status